The Veteran Reserve Corps (originally the Invalid Corps) was a military reserve organization created within the Union Army during the American Civil War to allow partially disabled or otherwise infirm soldiers (or former soldiers) to perform light duty, freeing able-bodied soldiers to serve on the front lines.

The Invalid Corps
The corps was organized under authority of General Order No. 105, U.S. War Department, dated April 28, 1863. A similar corps had existed in Revolutionary times between 1777 and 1783. The Invalid Corps of the Civil War period was created to make suitable use in a military or semi-military capacity of soldiers who had been rendered unfit for active field service on account of wounds or disease contracted in line of duty, but who were still fit for garrison or other light duty, and were, in the opinion of their commanding officers, meritorious and deserving.

Qualifications
Those serving in the Invalid Corps were divided into two classes: 
Class 1, partially disabled soldiers whose periods of service had not yet expired, and who were transferred directly to the Corps, there to complete their terms of enlistment; 
Class 2, soldiers who had been discharged from the service on account of wounds, disease, or other disabilities, but who were yet able to perform light military duty and desired to do so.

As the war went on, it proved that the additions to the Corps hardly equaled the losses by discharge or otherwise, so it was finally ordered that the men who had had two years of honorable service in the Union Army or Marine Corps might enlist in the Invalid Corps without regard to disability.

The soldiers shown in the rosters of the 15th Massachusetts Volunteer Infantry Regiment (where they originally enlisted) and who then transferred to the V. R. C. belong to Class 1.

The Veteran Reserve Corps
The title "Veteran Reserve Corps" was substituted for that of "Invalid Corps" by General Order No. 111, dated March 18, 1864, to boost the morale as the same initials "I.C." were stamped on condemned property meaning, "Inspected-Condemned". The men serving in the Veteran Reserve Corps were organized into two battalions; the First Battalion including those whose disabilities were comparatively slight and who were still able to handle a musket and do some marching, also to perform guard or provost duty. The Second Battalion was made up of men whose disabilities were more serious, who had perhaps lost limbs or suffered some other grave injury. These latter were commonly employed as cooks, orderlies, nurses, or guards in public buildings.

Uniforms

Invalid Corps members stood out because of their unique uniforms. According to General Orders No. 124, issued May 15, 1863, The uniform was trimmed in dark blue, with chevrons of rank and the background of officer's shoulder insignia having that color as a backing.

Invalid Corps troops also wore standard dark blue fatigue blouses from time to time. Standard forage caps were to be decorated with the brass infantry horn, regimental number, and company letter.

Officers also wore sky blue; a frock coat of sky-blue cloth, with dark blue velvet collar and cuffs, in all other respects according to the present pattern for officers of infantry. Shoulder straps were also to match current patterns but dark-blue velvet. Officers also wore gold epaulets on parade. Eventually officers were allowed to wear the standard dark-blue frock, ostensibly because sky-blue frocks soiled easily. Some officers had their frocks cut down to make uniforms or shell jackets. By the war's end, however, the army was still making sky-blue officers' frocks.

Organization
There were twenty-four regiments in the Corps. These regiments were organized into one division and three brigades. In the beginning, each regiment was made up of six companies of the First Battalion and four of the Second Battalion, but in the latter part of the war, this method of organization was not strictly adhered to. The 18th Regiment, for example, which rendered exceptionally good service in Virginia at Belle Plain, Port Royal, and White House Landing in the spring and early summer of 1864, and in or near Washington DC in the latter part of the summer and through the fall of that year, was made up of only six Second Battalion companies.

There were from two to three times as many men in the First Battalion as in the Second, and the soldiers in the First Battalion performed a wide variety of duties. They furnished guards for the Union prison camps at Johnson's Island, Ohio, Elmira, New York, Point Lookout, Maryland, and elsewhere. They furnished details to the provost marshals to arrest bounty jumpers and to enforce the draft. They escorted substitutes, recruits, and prisoners to and from the front. They guarded railroads, did patrol duty in Washington DC, and even manned the defenses of the city during Jubal Early's raid against Fort Stevens in July 1864.

During the war, more than 60,000 men served in the Corps in the Union army; 1,700 soldiers during the service in the Federal Veteran Reserve Corps, of whom 24 died in action.  Several thousand also served in a Confederate counterpart, the Southern Invalid Corps, although it was never officially organized into actual battalions.

Four members from Company F of the Fourteenth Veteran Reserves conducted the execution of the four conspirators linked to the assassination of Abraham Lincoln on July 7, 1865, at Fort McNair in Washington, D.C. They knocked out the post that released the platform that hanged Mary Surratt, Lewis Powell, David Herold, and George Atzerodt.

The Federal corps was mostly disbanded in 1866 following the close of the Civil War and the lessening of a need for reserve troops. The reorganization of the Regular Army in July 1866 provided for four regiments of the Veteran Reserve Corps. The Veteran Reserve Corps completely ceased to exist when these regiments were consolidated with other regiments in the Army's next re-organization in March 1869.

The Modern Veteran Reserve Corps 

Today, the Veteran Reserve Corps exists as an established tax-exempt organization that operates similarly to the Civil Air Patrol and the U.S. Coast Guard Auxiliary. The Veteran Reserve Corps assists states and the federal government in emergency response and disaster relief.  Officers and enlisted soldiers are required to earn the MEMS Badge through the State Guard Association of the United States, as well as complete Initial Entry Training (enlisted) or a Basic Officer Leadership Course that incorporates many of the components of Army leadership training.

Because of its emergency response nature, the Veteran Reserve Corps trains through the Federal Emergency Management Agency's Emergency Management Institute.

Organization 
Following the Army structure, the Veteran Reserve Corps has a Division Headquarters in Dover, DE and is currently divided into a North Brigade and South Brigade.  The line of demarcation between the two brigades runs along the 36th parallel.

Battalions are subdivided into Companies, Platoons, and Squads and each is commanded by an officer or NCO of the equivalent Army rank (Company - Captain, Platoon - Second or First Lieutenant, Squad - Staff Sargent).

Soldiers must be at least 18 years old to join  the VRC as enlisted, officers must hold a secondary education degree; typically a bachelor's degree and all individuals must be "physically and mentally capable" to perform the duties required within the Incident Command Structure and National Incident Management System. Individuals who align themselves with antigovernmental militias or harbor such views are ineligible to join, as soldiers within the Veteran Reserve Corps swear an oath to the Constitution and to obey all lawful orders of civilian commanders.

Disabled veterans can serve in support roles.

Leadership 
The Commanding General James F. Coleman, a veteran of the United States Air Force and Maryland Air National Guard. He became Commanding General of the Maryland Defense Force in 2015.

Deputy Commander, Brigadier General Raymond W. Copp served as Command Chaplain in the Maryland Defense Force and was a Maryland Air National Guard and Army Reserve Veteran.

The Chief of Staff is Colonel Carolyn Copp, who was Commissioned through the Maryland Defense Force and served in the 121st Engineer Regiment before becoming the Plans & Training Officer for the Maryland Air National Guard Joint Force Headquarters.

Uniforms 
The U.S. VRC follows the structure of the Army, and wears current Army OCP, Service Blues, and Pink and Greens with the appropriate "VRC" indicia.  The OCP uniforms consist of a subdued American flag on the right sleeve, with "U.S. VRC" nametape over the left breast, and a unit SSI on the left sleeve. Prior service soldiers are authorized to wear skills badges and skills tabs in accordance with AR/VRC-670-1 uniform regulations. Military badges and ribbons from other branches of service are authorized for wear on the service uniforms, provided they are within order of precedence.

See also
The Invalid Corps, a humorous song written about the Veteran Reserve Corps
United States Guards
Corps of Invalids (Great Britain)

References

Further reading
 Pelka, Fred . The Civil War Letters of Charles F. Johnson, Invalid Corps. Amherst and Boston, MA: University of Massachusetts Press, 2004. .
 Lande, R. Gregory. Invalid Corps, Military Medicine, Vol. 173, no. 6, 2008, pp. 525–528.
 "Invalid Corps/Veteran Reserve Corps" in Wagner, Margaret E., Gary W. Gallagher, and Paul Finkelman. The Library of Congress Civil War Desk Reference. New York: Simon & Schuster, 2002, pp. 441–442.

External links
The Civil War Archive – Union Regimental Index – U.S.V.R.C.
The 9th Regiment Invalid Corps – Civil War reenactors
The 8th Regiment Veteran Reserve Corps – Civil War reenactors

Military units and formations of the Union Army
Union Army corps
1863 establishments in the United States
Disability in the United States